Siti Safiyah Amirah is a Malaysian ten-pin bowler. She finished first place at the 2009 WTBA World Ranking Masters.

Notes

Living people
Malaysian people of Malay descent
Malaysian ten-pin bowling players
Year of birth missing (living people)
Place of birth missing (living people)
Asian Games medalists in bowling
Bowlers at the 2014 Asian Games
Bowlers at the 2018 Asian Games
Medalists at the 2018 Asian Games
Asian Games silver medalists for Malaysia
Southeast Asian Games gold medalists for Indonesia
Southeast Asian Games bronze medalists for Malaysia
Southeast Asian Games medalists in bowling
Competitors at the 2007 Southeast Asian Games
Competitors at the 2015 Southeast Asian Games
Competitors at the 2017 Southeast Asian Games
Competitors at the 2019 Southeast Asian Games